Svitava may refer to:

 Svitava (Čapljina), village in Herzegovina
 Svitava (river)